The Museum of the Roman Civilization (Italian: Museo della Civiltà Romana) is a museum in Rome (Esposizione Universale Roma district), devoted to aspects of the Ancient Roman Civilization.

The museum has been closed for renovation since 2014.

History and general introduction

It was designed by the architects Pietro Ascheri, D. Bernardini and Cesare Pascoletti (1939–1941).
Its 59 sections illustrate the history of Roman civilization, from the origins to the 4th century, with models and reproductions, as well as original material. The premises are shared with a planetarium.

It houses, among other things:
 a model of Archaic Rome (Room XVIII)
 a scale model of ancient Rome in the age of Constantine I by Italo Gismondi (Room XXXVII-XXXVIII), derived from the Forma Urbis Romae map and integrated with archeological discoveries. This model is at a 1:250 scale and is made of plaster. The model was begun in 1935 and completed in 1971. This model is today the most important reference for any serious attempt of reconstruction of the Ancient Rome: it has been used for the "Rome Reborn 1.0" 3D Visualization Project (B. Frischer, Director, University of Virginia; D. Favro, Associate Director, UCLA; D. Abernathy, Director of 3D Modeling, University of Virginia; G. Guidi, Director of 3D Scanning, Politecnico di Milano). Gismondi's model can be seen also in a few shots of Ridley Scott's Gladiator.
 examples of late imperial and early Christian art
 a complete sequence of casts of the spiral reliefs round Trajan's Column, arranged in horizontal rows at ground level to facilitate reading.
 a reconstructed Roman library based on that in the Villa Adriana at Tivoli

The museum was closed for renovation in January 2014. Work on the renovation was started in June 2017; as of November 2019, no date has been announced for the reopening.

Structure
There are three main different itineraries through the rooms of the museum:
 Historical sections
 Thematic sections
 Model of Imperial Rome

Historical sections
Room V-VI: Roman Legends and Primitive Culture - the origins of Rome
Room VII: The conquest of the Mediterranean
Room VIII: Caesar
Room IX: Augustus
 Lifesize copy of the pronaos of the Monumentum Ancyranum, the Temple of Augustus and Rome, Ankara, Turkey, including the Res Gestae Divi Augusti inscription
 Scale reconstruction model (1:100) of the Theatre of Marcellus, Rome
 Scale reconstruction model (1:20) of the Tropaeum Alpium in La Turbie, France
 Scale reconstruction model (1:200) of the Pont du Gard, Nîmes, France
Room X: The family of Augustus and the Julio-Claudian emperors
Room XI: The Flavian Dynasty
Room XII: Trajan and Hadrian
Room XIII: The emperors from Antoninus Pius to the Severans
Room XIV: The emperors from Macrinus to Justinian
Room XV: Christianity
Room XVI: The army
Room XVIII: Model of archaic Rome

Thematic sections
Room XXXVI: School
Room XXXIX: Living spaces
Room XLVI: Rights
Room XLVII: Libraries
Room XLVIII: Music
Room XLIX: Literature and science
Room L: Medicine and drugs
Room LI: Trajan's Column
Room LII: Industry and craft
Room LIII: Agriculture, herding and land management
Room LIV: Hunting, fishing and food
Room LV: Commerce and economic life
Room LVI: Art of rome

Model of Imperial Rome
Room XXXVII-XXXVIII: Model of Imperial Rome (in the age of Constantine I)

Appearance in popular culture
In the James Bond film Spectre, the marble colonnade of the museum doubled as a cemetery after the Archconfraternity of the Departed  confraternity barred the filming of a funeral scene at the Campo Verano cemetery. The music video of the song "Cruel Summer" by group Ace of Base was also filmed at this location in 1998.

References

External links
 Model of Archaic Rome
 

Museums in Rome
Museums established in 1955
Museums of ancient Rome in Italy
Museums of Dacia
Dacia in art
Rome Q. XXXII Europa
1955 establishments in Italy